Benigno Aquino may refer to:

Benigno Aquino Sr. (1894–1947), Filipino politician and speaker of the Second Philippine Republic National Assembly from 1943 to 1944
Benigno Aquino Jr. (1932–1983), Philippine senator, son of Benigno Sr., and former governor of Tarlac
Benigno Aquino III (1960–2021), Filipino politician, son of Benigno Jr., and former president of the Philippines
Paolo Benigno Aquino IV (born 1977), Filipino politician, nephew of Benigno Jr.